Pro Electron or EECA is the European type designation and registration system for active components (such as semiconductors, liquid crystal displays, sensor devices, electronic tubes and cathode ray tubes).

Pro Electron was set up in 1966 in Brussels, Belgium. In 1983 it was merged with the European Electronic Component Manufacturers Association (EECA) and since then operates as an agency of the EECA.

The goal of Pro Electron is to allow unambiguous identification of electronic parts, even when made by several different manufacturers. To this end, manufacturers register new devices with the agency and receive new type designators for them.

Designation system 
Examples of Pro Electron type designators are:
 AD162        – Germanium power transistor for audio frequency use
 BY133        – Silicon rectifier
 BZY88C5V1    – Silicon 5.1 volt Zener diode
 CQY97        – light emitting diode
 ECC83        – 6.3 volt heater noval dual triode
 A63EAA00XX01 – Color TV picture tube
 SAA1300      – Digital integrated circuit

Pro Electron took the popular European coding system in use from around 1934 for valves (tubes), i.e. the Mullard–Philips tube designation, and essentially re-allocated several of the rarely used heater designations (first letter of the part number) for semiconductors. The second letter was used in a similar way to the valves naming convention: "A" for signal diode, "C" for low-power bipolar transistor or triode, "D" for high-power transistor (or triode), and "Y" for rectifier, but other letter designations did not follow the vacuum tube mode so closely.

The three digits (or letter followed by two digits) after the first two letters were essentially a sequence number, with (at first) a vestige of the valve-era convention that the first one or two digits would indicate the base (package) type in examples such as in this family of general-purpose transistors:

... where x may be:
 7 for high voltage
 8 for general purpose
 9 for low noise/high gain

Pro Electron naming for transistors and Zener diodes has been widely taken up by semiconductor manufactures around the world. Pro Electron naming of integrated circuits, other than some special (e.g. television signal-processing) chips, did not greatly take hold (even in Europe). Other popular designation systems were used for many integrated circuits.

Differences between Pro Electron and earlier valve-naming conventions 

 Unlike the tube naming convention, if there are two transistors in a single envelope, the type letter was never repeated - so a dual NPN RF transistor might get a type "BFM505" rather than something like "BFF505" for instance. 
 Although some of the most popular devices conform to a pattern of serial numbers that identified package type and polarity, many do not.
 The letters assigned for the second character of transistor and diode type numbers differ in several ways, e.g.
 "B" tends to be used for dual varicap diodes
 "L" in the context of transistors designates RF power (transmitting) transistors; for valves it meant a high-power pentode tube (the usual choice for power RF)
 "Z" is used for semiconductor Zener diodes instead of (full-wave) rectifier valves (tubes).

Frequently used first letters in European active devices 

A Germanium (or any semiconductor with junctions in a material with a band gap of 0.6 to 1.0eV)
B Silicon (or band gap of 1.0 to 1.3eV)
C III-V semiconductors with a band gap of 1.3eV or more, like gallium arsenide in LEDs
D may be...
Semiconductors with a band gap less than 0.6eV, such as indium antimonide in infrared detectors (rarely used), or
(Mullard–Philips) 1.4V (or less) filament tubes
E (Mullard–Philips) tubes with a 6.3V heater
F Digital integrated circuits
P (Mullard–Philips) tubes for a 300mA series heater supply
R Devices without junctions, e.g. cadmium sulfide in a photoresistor
S Solitary digital integrated circuits
T Linear integrated circuits
U may be...
 (Mullard–Philips) tubes for a 100mA series heater supply, or
 Mixed digital/analogue integrated circuits

Electron tubes 

 See Mullard–Philips tube designation for details. A brief summary of just the more common letters is:
     ECC81
    /  \ \\__ last digit(s)=serial number
   /    \ \__ first digit(s)=base (3=8pin 8,18,80=Noval (B9A), 9=Mini 7-pin (B7G)
  /      \___ one letter per valve unit in the tube:
 D=1.4v or less      A=single-diode (low power)
 E=6.3v*             B=double-diode (usually shared cathode, but not always)
 P=300mA             C=triode
 U=100mA             F=pentode (low power)
                     L=pentode (high power)
                     Y=Single-phase rectifier
                     Z=Full-wave rectifier
 * Note: some 6.3 volt heater types have a split heater allowing series (12.6 volt; the
   default for Noval pins 4 to 5) or parallel (6.3 volt) operation.

Semiconductor diodes and transistors

The first letter gives the semiconductor type
(see above)

The second letter denotes the intended use

The serial number
Following these two letters is a 3- or 4-digit serial number (or another letter then digits), assigned by Pro Electron. It is not always merely a sequence number; there is sometimes information conveyed in the number:
 In early devices only, the serial number often indicated the case/package type (e.g. AF114-7 for TO-5 case, while AF124-7 were TO-72 versions of the same transistors); modern surface-mount devices often begin with "8",
 early silicon transistors followed the convention of using a middle digit of 0-5 for NPN and 6-9 for PNP. 
 the last digit often indicated a particular specification or application grouping, e.g. the AF117 and AF127 were similar IF amplifier devices in different cases; the BC109, BC149, BC169 and BC549 are similar low-noise transistors).
 some modern devices use letters, such as "B" to indicate HBT bipolar transistors.

Suffixes and version specifiers
Suffixes may be used, letters or perhaps blocks of digits delimited by "/" or "-" from the serial number, often without fixed meanings but some of the more common conventions are:
 for small-signal transistors "A" to "C" often means low to high hFE, such as in: BC549C),
 numeric suffixes may be used as an alternative way to show hFE (e.g. BC327-25), or voltage rating (e.g. BUK854-800A).
 for voltage reference diodes letters show the tolerance ("A","B","C","D","E" indicate 1%/2%/5%/10*/20%) and may be followed by the Vz value, e.g. 6V8 for 6.8 Volts or 18V for 18 volts.
 "R" can mean "reverse polarity".

Examples of suffixes and manufacturers' extensions to the basic sequence number include:

Note: A BC546 might only be marked "C546" by some manufacturers, thus possibly creating confusion with JIS abbreviated markings, because a transistor marked "C546" might also be a 2SC546.

Short summary of the most common semiconductor diode and transistor designations:
       BC549C
      / |--- \___ variant (A,B,C for transistors implies low, medium or high gain)
     /  |   \ serial number (at least 3 digits or letter and 2 digits)
    /  device type:
 A=Ge     A=Signal diode
 B=Si     C=LF low-power transistor
          D=LF Power transistor
          F=RF transistor (or FET) 
          P=Photosensitive transistor etc.
          T=Triac or thyristor
          Y=Rectifier diode
          Z=Zener diode

Usage in the Eastern Bloc
Poland, Hungary, Romania, and Cuba mostly used Pro Electron designations for discrete semiconductors just like Western Europe. Starting in 1971, in Poland the letter "P" was inserted, e.g. BUY54 became BUYP54. Kombinat Mikroelektronik Erfurt (KME) in East Germany and Tesla (Czechoslovak company) used designations derived from the Pro Electron scheme. In particular, the first letter specifying the material differed while the second letter followed the table above (with the few exceptions for KME noted below).

Examples: GD241C - Germanium power transistor from KME; MB111 - optoisolator from KME; KD503 - Silicon power transistor from Tesla; LQ100 - LED from Tesla.

Integrated circuits
The integrated circuit designation consists of three letters, followed by a serial number of three to five digits. Initially, only three-digit serial numbers were allowed. For designations with a three-digit serial number the third initial letter had a defined meaning for digital integrated circuits (see below) and the operating temperature range was encoded in the last digit of the serial number. The specification was changed in 1973 to allow longer serial numbers. For designations with a serial number of more than three digits the third initial letter encodes the temperature range. Optionally, a version letter (A, B, ...) and / or a package designation can follow after the serial number.

Digital logic families 
The combination of first letter and second letter is assigned to a specific manufacturer.

    FCH171
   //  \ \__ serial number (including temperature range)
  //    \___ H=gate ("Combinatorial circuit"), J=flip-flop, K=monostable, L=level shifter, Q=RAM, R=ROM, Y=miscellaneous etc.
 FC=DTL by Philips / Mullard
 FD=dynamic PMOS by Philips / Mullard
 FE=PMOS by Philips / Mullard
 FH=TTL by Philips (SUHL II series)
 FJ=TTL by Philips / Mullard (7400 series)
 FK=E2CL by Philips
 FL=TTL by Siemens (7400 series)
 FN=ECL by Telefunken
 FP=HTL by Telefunken
 FQ=DTL by SGS-ATES
 FS=SECL by Telefunken
 FY=ECL by Siemens
 FZ=HTL by Siemens
 GD=PMOS by Siemens (MEM1000 series)
 GH=ECL by Philips
 GJ=TTL by Mullard (74H00 series)
 GR=interface devices by Mullard (7500 series)
 GT=TTL by Mullard (74S00 series)

Unfortunately the serial number does not specify the same type of gate in each family, e.g. while an FJH131 is a quadruple 2-input NAND gate (like the 7400), an FCH131 is a dual 4-input NAND gate, and an FLH131 is an 8-input NAND gate (equivalent to 7430). To lessen the confusion at least for the 7400 series, at some point manufacturers included the well-known 7400 series designation both in their literature and on the integrated circuits themselves.

See also

JEDEC
JIS semiconductor designation
Mullard–Philips tube designation
RMA tube designation
RETMA tube designation
Russian tube designations
Soviet integrated circuit designation
East German integrated circuit designation

References

External links 
 Pro Electron
 European Type Designation Code System for Electronic Components (15 ed), Pro-Electron, Brussels, Belgium, 6/2008; with tube designation systems

Electrical standards
Electrical components
Electronics lists